The Shuimogou Scenic Area, or Shuimogou Scenic Spot, also called Shuimogou Park, is a scenic spot located in Shuimogou District, Urumqi City, Xinjiang Uygur Autonomous Region, People's Republic of China.  It consists of "five mountains and one river"-Qingquan Mountain, Hongqiao Mountain, Hot Spring Mountain, Shuita Mountain, Snow Lotus Mountain and Shuimo River. It was established as a tourist attraction in the Qing Dynasty.

The total area of Shuimogou Scenic Area is about 3.7 square kilometers, and it was rated as a National AAAA Tourist Attraction in China by the China National Tourism Administration in 2006.

References

Parks in Xinjiang
Ürümqi
National scenic areas